Austevollshella or Austevoll is a village in Austevoll municipality, Norway. Austevollshella is located on the southeastern coast of the island of Hundvåko.  The Austevoll Bridge, which connects Hundvåko and Huftarøy islands, is located at Austevollshella.  The village has been the site of a church since the middle ages.  Austevoll Church was located here until 1890 when it was torn down and rebuilt in the larger village of Storebø.  One hundred years later, Hundvåkøy Chapel was built at Austevollshella to serve the people of the island.

References

Villages in Vestland
Austevoll